Jorge Manuel López, also known as Giro Lopez (born March 9, 1971), is a Puerto Rican salsa musician. Giro began his career as part of the boy band of Puerto Rico called Los Chicos.  Two singles by "Giro" Jorge López, "Si Tu Supieras" and "Mi Forma de Sentir", reached #1 on the Latin Tropical Airplay. In 1995, Giro received a Lo Nuestro award for "New Tropical Singer of the Year" and in 1996 also was nominated for Best Male Tropical Singer of the Year.
 
He won a Gold Record at the New Jersey OTT Awards (National Songwriters Contest), presented by Billboard magazine.

He was signed to Sony Music (SDI - Sony Discos International) from 1988 until 2000. In 1988 Jorge studied voice and acting at Mercer County Community College in East Windsor New Jersey for 2 semesters before returning to Puerto Rico to launch his solo career.

His 2002 album, Mi Nostalgia, received a Latin Grammy nomination for "Best Salsa Album". His 2011 CD release under Giro Productions and Oriente Music Group "Todavia Hay Amor" was produced by Cuto Soto and Gunda Merced. It contains three compositions, “Se Que Perdi,” “No Te Puedo Olvidar” and “Llegaste,” by salsa songwriter and composer Pedro Azael and a re-recorded version of his early hit “Me he enamorado,” written by Pepe Luis Soto. The song that received the most airplay on Latin music stations was a duet with La India of “Islas En El Mar,” the Spanish version of “Islands in the Stream” first recorded by Kenny Rogers and Dolly Parton.

As a solo artist Giro has performed and collaborated with Marc Anthony, Ruben Blades, Luis Enrique, Willie Colón, Frankie Ruiz, Rey Ruiz, Eddie Santiago, Gilberto Santa Rosa, Tito Rojas, Víctor Manuelle, and Jerry Rivera. On February 12, 2011 Giro appeared at the Best of the 1990s show at Trump Plaza in New York City, along with other salsa colleagues such as La India, Tito Nieves, Tony Vega, Jerry Rivera, Eddie Santiago, Lalo Rodriguez, and Tito Rojas. In May 2011 Giro appeared at the New Orleans Jazz Festival.

In addition to large Latin music markets in the USA like Miami, Chicago, Los Angeles, Texas and New York City, Giro has penetrated into Europe and Asia and also the Caribbean and Central and South American tropical music markets, spending six months in Brazil alone between Sao Paulo, Rio de Janeiro, and Recife, and touring heavily in 2011 throughout Colombia, Peru, Venezuela, Panama, Nicaragua, Costa Rica, the Dominican Republic, Canada and Puerto Rico.  Giro is currently managed by Chino Rodriguez.

Discography
In the 1990s Giro started his individual career and has released albums such as:
Simplemente Un Corazón (Sony U.S. Latin, 1993)
Amor Lunático (Sony Latin, 1994)
Loco Corazón (Sony U.S. Latin, 1995)
Historias de Amor (Sony U.S. Latin, 1997)
Giro (Sony Discos, 1999)
Quinceañera (Sony Special, 1999)
Mi Nostalgia (Musical Productions, 2002)
Todavía Hay Amor (Oriente Music Group, 2010)

See also
 List of Puerto Ricans
 Official website - www.GiroLopez.com

References

20th-century Puerto Rican male singers
Salsa musicians
Living people
People from Caguas, Puerto Rico
21st-century Puerto Rican male singers
1971 births